The Environmental Music Prize is a prize launched in partnership with Green Music Australia. It aims to celebrate and amplify powerful music videos that inspire action for climate and conservation. It was launched during the United Nations Climate Change Conference in November 2021 and is a call-to-action for artists to use their voice both on and off stage. The Environmental Music Prize is a quest to find a theme song to inspire action on climate and conservation.

Awards by year

2022
To eligible for the inaugural prize, Australian citizens and residents could apply between November 2021 and February 2022) if they had released an original work in the last 5 years that 1) referenced nature or an environmental issue in its lyrics, or in the visual content of its music video and 2) inspires us to protect the environment with a message of hope or a call-to-action, or highlights the urgency of action.

Between February and April 2022, a shortlisting committee composed of music ambassadors, environmental leaders and impact partners selected the 24 finalists.
Public Voting commenced on Earth Day, 22 April 2022 and closed on 22 May 2022.

In June 2022, King Gizzard were announced as winners and donated the $20,000 prize money to The Wilderness Society.

2023
In January 2023, entries were open to Australian citizens and residents who had released an original song and music video between 1 January 2020 and 28 Feb 2023.

The submitted works must:
• Reference nature or an environmental issue in its lyrics, or in the visual content of its music video.
• Connect us to the natural world, encourage us to reflect, or inspire us to protect the environment.
• Be submitted as a music video on Youtube that is publicly available to watch and share.

Finalists will be announced on 22 April 2023 (Earth Day), with public voting to open after that and the winner to be announced in June 2023.

References

External links

 

Australian music awards
Awards established in 2021
2021 establishments in Australia
Annual events in Australia
Environmental awards
Environmentalism in Australia